Bianco e Nero (Italian for "Black and  White") is an Italian film journal. It is the oldest film publication in Italy.

History and profile
Bianco e Nero was founded in 1937 by Luigi Chiarini as the official organ of the drama school Centro Sperimentale di Cinematografia. It was started as a monthly journal, and its contents included reviews and essays on film pedagogy and theory. Its first director was Luigi Freddi. Since 1939, the magazine also published a series of special monographic books on history, form and technique of cinema. It temporarily ceased publication between 1944 and 1946 because of World War II and resumed in 1947. In 1999 the journal changed its spelling in Bianco & Nero and became a bimonthly.

The magazine is published by the University of Rome Press.

The Spanish film magazine Objetivo was modeled on Bianca e Nero.

See also
 List of film periodicals
 List of magazines in Italy

Notes

External links
 WorldCat record

1937 establishments in Italy
Bi-monthly magazines published in Italy
Centro Sperimentale di Cinematografia
Film magazines published in Italy
Italian-language magazines
Magazines established in 1937
Magazines published in Rome
Monthly magazines published in Italy